Tsitana wallacei, or Wallace's sylph, is a butterfly of the family Hesperiidae. It is found in Africa, including the Democratic Republic of the Congo (Shaba), the Mwinilunga area of north-western Zambia and the Katavi National Park in western Tanzania.

Adults are on wing from January to March.

References

Butterflies described in 1910
Heteropterinae